is located on the border of Gujō, Gifu Prefecture, and Hakusan, Ishikawa Prefecture, Japan, and rises to a height of .

History
Mount Haku has been climbed for religious purposes for centuries. One popular hiking route from the Gifu Prefecture side of the mountains to Mount Haku's peak runs through Mount Bessan.

Geography
The surrounding area is part of Japan's snow country, so it is covered by snow for more than half of the year and various alpine plants can be seen.

Hiking paths
There is a walking route from Mount Bessan in the north.
The shortest route originates in Ōno, Fukui Prefecture.

References

See also 

 Ryōhaku Mountains
 Hakusan National Park

Sannomine, Mount
Sannomine, Mount